The East New York station is a station on the Long Island Rail Road's Atlantic Branch in the East New York and Ocean Hill neighborhoods of Brooklyn, New York City, where that branch passes through the Jamaica Pass. It is generally served by the West Hempstead Branch and the City Terminal Zone Atlantic Branches of the LIRR. The East New York station also formerly served the LIRR's Bay Ridge Branch until passenger service on that branch ended in 1924.

Station layout
This station is located at ground level, in the median of Atlantic Avenue, and underneath the elevated main lanes of Atlantic Avenue, with one eight-car side platform on either side of the two-track line. A closed ticket office is located in the underpass, which has staircases to the southwest corner of East New York and Atlantic avenues and the northwest corner of Van Sinderen and Atlantic avenues. On either side of the station, the tracks submerge into a tunnel, allowing the main lanes of Atlantic Avenue to return to the surface.

History

When the Brooklyn and Jamaica Railroad opened in 1836, under lease to the LIRR, it did not include a station at East New York. The LIRR began stopping at East New York by early 1843, eventually stopping at the Howard House at Alabama Avenue, shared with all the other horse car and steam lines into East New York. From 1861 to 1877, East New York served as the west end of steam service along the Atlantic Branch.

By 1878, local Atlantic Avenue rapid transit trains began stopping at a new station, Manhattan Beach Railroad Crossing, at the New York and Manhattan Beach Railway crossing at Van Sinderen Avenue. This later became the main East New York station, with only these local trains stopping at Howard House. The Atlantic Avenue Improvement, completed in 1905, resulted in the closing of the Howard House station, and the expanded Manhattan Crossing station was renamed East New York. The elevated Warwick Street station, 18 blocks east, was also labeled as serving East New York; it closed in 1939, when the elevated railway east of East New York was buried in the current tunnel.

East New York was also a station on the New York and Manhattan Beach Railway, now the Bay Ridge Branch, from its opening in July 1877 until May 1924, when passenger service on the branch ended. It was initially at grade level where the lines crossed, but was placed in a tunnel in 1915; the platforms, under East New York Avenue, still exist. Until the 1930s, a grade-level freight connection existed in the southeast quadrant between the two lines.

In 1924, the station was the location of a firework accident that resulted in Palsgraf v. Long Island Railroad Co., an oft-cited court case on the doctrine of proximate cause.

In the 2010s, many locals and elected officials such as Brooklyn's borough president, Eric Adams, advocated for renovations to the station, including bringing it into compliance with the Americans with Disabilities Act of 1990.

References

External links 
 

 Atlantic Avenue entrance, under Canarsie Line from Google Maps Street View
 Platforms from Google Maps Street View
 ENY Interlocking (The LIRR Today)

Long Island Rail Road stations in New York City
East New York, Brooklyn
Railway stations in Brooklyn
Railway stations in the United States opened in 1878